Howard John Goddard (born 10 May 1957) is an English former professional footballer. A striker, he joined Newport County in 1977 from Swindon Town. He went on to make 105 appearances for Newport scoring 42 goals. In 1982, he spent time on loan at Blackpool, scoring twice in four matches before joining Bournemouth.

References

External links

English footballers
Newport County A.F.C. players
Blackpool F.C. players
AFC Bournemouth players
English Football League players
Living people
1957 births
Association football forwards
Swindon Town F.C. players
Aldershot F.C. players
Trowbridge Town F.C. players
People from Hampshire (before 1974)